Cow Mound is a ghost town in Woodruff County, Arkansas, United States.

References

Geography of Woodruff County, Arkansas